The Albany Alleycats is a premier soccer club based out of Albany, New York, with teams competing in the USYS National League, EDP, and CDYSL.

Staff
 John Bramley – Managing Director

Coaches
 John Bramley (1995)
 Leszek Wrona (1996–1997)
 Adam Clinton (1998)

Year-by-year

External links
 Website

Sports in Albany, New York
Defunct soccer clubs in New York (state)
Men's soccer clubs in New York (state)
1995 establishments in New York (state)
1999 disestablishments in New York (state)
Association football clubs established in 1995
Association football clubs disestablished in 1999